The South Western Slopes, also known as the South West Slopes, is a region predominantly in New South Wales, Australia. It covers the lower inland slopes of the Great Dividing Range, extending from north of Dunedoo through central NSW and into northeast Victoria, meeting its southwestern end around Beechworth. More than 90% of the region is in the state of New South Wales and it occupies about 10% of that state.

Bioregion 
The South Western Slopes bioregion covers the lower inland slopes of the Great Dividing Range extending from north of Dunedoo through central NSW and into northeast Victoria, meeting its southwestern end around Beechworth. More than 90% of the region is in the state of New South Wales and it occupies about 10% of that state – more than 80,000 km2.

The bioregion includes parts of the Murray, Murrumbidgee, Lachlan and Macquarie River catchments.

The bioregion is divided into three sub-regions:

 Inland Slopes subregion (NSS01)
 Lower Slopes subregion (NSS02)
 Capertee Valley subregion (NSS03)

Climate
Mean annual temperatures in the region range from very cool to warm; from just  up to  depending on altitude and latitude.

Snow has been recorded on a few occasions to fall and settle as low as Albury and Wagga Wagga,  and  respectively. Sleet moreover is usually a widespread occurrence throughout the region, even in the lowland areas—especially in the south. Depending on latitude, rainfall peaks in either winter or spring; the more southern and mountainous areas show a distinct winter peak, as opposed to one of springtime. High summer to mid autumn is usually the driest period and is prone to severe drought. 

This is due to being windward of the Great Dividing Range, with the prevailing westerly cloud bringing low maximum temperatures in winter; and the far inland location, prolonging heatwaves in summer. These areas have a climate that is more similar to that of Adelaide and Perth, than the proximate cities like Sydney and Wollongong, with their wet winters and relatively dry summers.

Forecast area for Bureau of Meteorology
The South West Slopes forecast area used by the Bureau of Meteorology includes only a region stretching approximately between Young and Tumbarumba from north to south. The area is much smaller than that defined as a bioregion by the NSW National Parks & Wildlife Service, as the Bureau of Meteorolgy has split this bioregion into three additional forecast districts: the Central West Slopes & Plains, constituting the northern parts of the bioregion; as well as North East (Victoria) and Riverina, which constitute the remaining south and west of the bioregion.

Flora and fauna
Most of the site is modified wheat-growing and sheep-grazing country with only vestiges of its original vegetation.  Remnant patches of woodland and scattered large trees, especially of mugga ironbark, apple box, grey box, white box, yellow box, red box, yellow gum, river red gum and Blakely's red gum, still provide habitat for the parrots.  Protected areas within the site include several nature reserves and state forests, as well as the Livingstone and Weddin Mountains National Parks, and Tarcutta Hills Reserve.

Important Bird Area

Protected areas
The South Western Slopes of NSW are some of the most highly cleared and altered lands in the state. Native vegetation remains generally only in small, isolated patches. Substantial clearing continues.  Less than 2% of the bioregion is protected as reserves.  Conservation efforts are focussing on landholder stewardship agreements.

National Parks: Benambra National Park, Conimbla National Park, Goobang National Park, Jindalee National Park, Livingstone National Park, Minjary National Park, Nangar National Park, Weddin Mountains National Park, Woomargama National Park
Nature reserves: Avisford Nature Reserve, Big Bush Nature Reserve, Boginderra Hills Nature Reserve, Buddigower Nature Reserve, Burrinjuck Nature Reserve, Copperhannia Nature Reserve, Dananbilla Nature Reserve, Dapper Nature Reserve, Downfall Nature Reserve, Ellerslie Nature Reserve, Eugowra Nature Reserve, Flagstaff Memorial Nature Reserve, Ingalba Nature Reserve, Koorawatha Nature Reserve, Mudjarn Nature Reserve, Mullengandra Nature Reserve, Munghorn Gap Nature Reserve, Narrandera Nature Reserve, Nest Hill Nature Reserve, Pucawan Nature Reserve, Razorback Nature Reserve, Tabletop Nature Reserve, The Charcoal Tank Nature Reserve, The Rock Nature Reserve, Ulandra Nature Reserve, Wiesners Swamp Nature Reserve
Historic sites: Hill End Historic Site, Yuranighs Aboriginal Grave Historic Site

Human settlement
The South Western Slopes was occupied by the Wiradjuri people, the largest Aboriginal language group in NSW.

Notable towns and cities within the bioregion, from Beechworth in the southwest to Dunedoo in the northeast, include Wodonga, Albury, Corryong, Tumbarumba, Batlow, Wagga Wagga, Junee, Tumut, Gundagai, Cootamundra, Temora, Grenfell, Young, Cowra, Forbes, Parkes, Orange and Mudgee. Griffith lies just outside the western boundary and Crookwell lies just outside the eastern boundary of the bioregion. The highland regions nearer the Great Divide; such as Orange, Crookwell or Batlow, can also be considered a part of the South Eastern Highlands bioregion.

Local government areas included in the bioregion:
 Mid-Western Regional Council – townships of Rylstone (on the border) and Mudgee 
 Dubbo Regional Council
 Cabonne Shire including the town of Molong
 Parkes Shire
 Forbes Shire
 Weddin Shire including the town of Grenfell
 Bland Shire, including the town of West Wyalong
 Hilltops Council including the town of Young
 Temora Shire
 Cootamundra-Gundagai Regional Council
 Snowy Valleys Council
 City of Wagga Wagga
 City of Albury
 Greater Hume Shire
 Shire of Towong in northeast Victoria
 Shire of Indigo, on the boundary between northeast and central Victoria

References 

Regions of New South Wales
Important Bird Areas of New South Wales
Southeast Australia temperate forests
IBRA regions
Biogeography of New South Wales